Sherburne Peak is a  mountain located in the Lewis Range, Glacier National Park in the U.S. state of Montana.  Sherburne Peak has two summits: the higher one being in Glacier National Park and the lower summit is located within the Blackfeet Indian Reservation.

See also
 Mountains and mountain ranges of Glacier National Park (U.S.)

References

Sherburne
Sherburne
Lewis Range
Mountains of Montana